Antonina Nikolayevna Popova (née Zolotukhina; born 25 April 1935) is a Soviet athlete. She competed in the women's discus throw at the 1968 Summer Olympics.

References

External links
 

1935 births
Living people
Athletes (track and field) at the 1968 Summer Olympics
Soviet female discus throwers
Olympic athletes of the Soviet Union
Place of birth missing (living people)
Universiade medalists in athletics (track and field)
Universiade silver medalists for the Soviet Union